Alistair Guss (born 10 June 1965) is an Australian alpine skier. He competed in the men's downhill at the 1984 Winter Olympics.

References

1965 births
Living people
Australian male alpine skiers
Olympic alpine skiers of Australia
Alpine skiers at the 1984 Winter Olympics
Skiers from Melbourne